Libera may refer to:
 Libera (mythology), a Roman goddess of fertility
 Libera (choir), a boy vocal group from London
 Libera (film), a 1993 comedy film 
 "Libera" (song), a song by Italian artist Mia Martini
 Libera (gastropod), a genus of gastropods in the family Endodontidae
 Libera Awards for music 
 Libera. Associazioni, nomi e numeri contro le mafie, Italian association against mafias
 Libera Chat, IRC network created in 2021 by former Freenode staff members
 Libera Università Mediterranea, an Italian university
 Libera Carlier, Belgian writer
 Libera Trevisani Levi-Civita, Italian mathematician
 771 Libera, an asteroid

See also 
 Libera me ("Deliver me"), a Roman Catholic responsory that is sung in the Office of the Dead
 Libera (surname)
 Liberia (disambiguation)